M-phase inducer phosphatase 3 is an enzyme that in humans is encoded by the CDC25C gene.

This gene is highly conserved during evolution and it plays a key role in the regulation of cell division. The encoded protein is a tyrosine phosphatase and belongs to the Cdc25 phosphatase family. It directs dephosphorylation of cyclin B-bound CDC2 (CDK1) and triggers entry into mitosis. It is also thought to suppress p53-induced growth arrest. Multiple alternatively spliced transcript variants of this gene have been described, however, the full-length nature of many of them is not known.

Interactions
CDC25C has been shown to interact with MAPK14, CHEK1, PCNA, PIN1, PLK3 and NEDD4.

See also
 Cdc25

References

Further reading

External links